Route 19, or Highway 19, may refer to:

For roads named "A19", see list of A19 roads.

International
 Asian Highway 19
 European route E19 
 European route E019

Canada
 Alberta Highway 19
 British Columbia Highway 19
 Manitoba Highway 19
 Nova Scotia Trunk 19
 Ontario Highway 19
 Route 19 (Prince Edward Island)
 Quebec Autoroute 19
 Saskatchewan Highway 19

Czech Republic
 I/19 Highway; Czech: Silnice I/19

Finland
 Finnish national road 19

Germany
 Bundesautobahn 19

India
  National Highway 19 (India)

Iran
 Road 19

Ireland
  N19 road (Ireland)

Italy
 Autostrada A19

Japan
 Japan National Route 19
 Chūō Expressway
 Nagano Expressway

Korea, South
 Guri–Pocheon Expressway (abolished and changed to  Sejong–Pocheon Expressway)
 National Route 19

Mexico
Mexican Federal Highway 19

Morocco 
 National Route

Paraguay
 National Route 19

Portugal
  A 19  A19 motorway

United Kingdom
 British A19 (Doncaster-Seaton Burn)

United States
 Interstate 19
 Interstate 19 Business
 U.S. Route 19
 U.S. Route 19W
 U.S. Route 19E
 Alabama State Route 19
 Arkansas Highway 19
 California State Route 19
 County route A19 (California)
 County Route E19 (California)
 County Route G19 (California)
 County Route J19 (California)
 County Route S19 (California)
 Connecticut Route 19
 Florida State Road 19
 Georgia State Route 19
 Hawaii Route 19
 Idaho State Highway 19
 Illinois Route 19
 Indiana State Road 19
 K-19 (Kansas highway)
 Kentucky Route 19
 Louisiana Highway 19
 Louisiana State Route 19
 Maryland Route 19
Maryland Route 19B (former)
 Massachusetts Route 19
 M-19 (Michigan highway)
 Minnesota State Highway 19
 County Road 19 (Chisago County, Minnesota)
 County Road 19 (Ramsey County, Minnesota)
 County Road 19 (Washington County, Minnesota)
 Mississippi Highway 19
 Missouri Route 19
 Montana Highway 19
 Nebraska Highway 19
 Nebraska Spur 19B
 Nebraska Spur 19C
 Nevada State Route 19 (former)
 New Jersey Route 19
 New Mexico State Road 19
 New York State Route 19
 County Route 19 (Allegany County, New York)
 County Route 19 (Chenango County, New York)
 County Route 19 (Columbia County, New York)
 County Route 19 (Dutchess County, New York)
 County Route 19 (Franklin County, New York)
 County Route 19 (Genesee County, New York)
 County Route 19 (Lewis County, New York)
 County Route 19 (Niagara County, New York)
 County Route 19 (Orange County, New York)
 County Route 19 (Otsego County, New York)
 County Route 19 (Rensselaer County, New York)
 County Route 19 (Schoharie County, New York)
 County Route 19 (Suffolk County, New York)
 County Route 19 (Sullivan County, New York)
 County Route 19 (Ulster County, New York)
 County Route 19 (Warren County, New York)
 County Route 19 (Wyoming County, New York)
 North Carolina Highway 19 (former)
 North Dakota Highway 19
 Ohio State Route 19
 Oklahoma State Highway 19
 Oklahoma State Highway 19C
 Oklahoma State Highway 19D
 Oregon Route 19
 Pennsylvania Route 19 (former)
 South Carolina Highway 19
 South Dakota Highway 19
 Tennessee State Route 19
 Texas State Highway 19
 Texas State Highway Loop 19
 Farm to Market Road 19
 Texas Park Road 19
 Utah State Route 19
 Virginia State Route 19 (former)
 Washington State Route 19
 Wisconsin Highway 19

Territories
 Puerto Rico Highway 19

Vietnam 
 National Route 19

See also
List of A19 roads
List of highways numbered 19A